Ternovoye is a rural locality (a selo) and the administrative center of Ternovskoye Rural Settlement, Yelansky District, Volgograd Oblast, Russia. The population was 880 as of 2010. There are 11 streets.

Geography 
Ternovoye is located on Khopyorsko-Buzulukskaya Plain, on the left bank of the Tersa River, 18 km north of Yelan (the district's administrative centre) by road. Nabat is the nearest rural locality.

References 

Rural localities in Yelansky District
Atkarsky Uyezd